Mets de Guaynabo may refer to several sport teams based in Guaynabo, Puerto Rico:

 Mets de Guaynabo (basketball), a team in the Baloncesto Superior Nacional
 Mets de Guaynabo (women's volleyball), a team in the Liga de Voleibol Superior Femenino
 Mets de Guaynabo (men's volleyball), a team in the Liga de Voleibol Superior Masculino